Chah Khashtu (also Romanized as Chāh Khashtū; also known as Chāh Khashdū) is a village in Sharifabad Rural District, in the Central District of Sirjan County, Kerman Province, Iran. At the 2006 census, its population was 35, in 9 families.

References 

Populated places in Sirjan County